Germany competed at the 2018 Winter Olympics in Pyeongchang, South Korea, from 9 to 25 February 2018, with 153 competitors in 14 sports. They won 31 medals in total, 14 gold, 10 silver and 7 bronze, ranking second in the medal table after Norway at the 2018 Winter Olympics. Germany excelled in ice track events (11 medals), biathlon (7 medals), Nordic combined (5 medals) and Ski jumping (4 medals). The men's ice hockey team took a silver medal, having lost a closely contested final to Olympic Athletes from Russia.

Medalists

Participants

The following is the list of number of competitors participating at the Games per sport/discipline.

Alpine skiing 

DOSB announced the 6 men and 6 women participating on 23 January 2017.

Men

Women

Mixed

Biathlon

Based on their Nations Cup rankings in the 2016–17 Biathlon World Cup, Germany has qualified a full team of 6 men and 6 women.

DOSB announced the 6 men and 6 women participating on 23 January 2017.

Men

Women

Mixed

Bobsleigh 

Based on their rankings in the 2017–18 Bobsleigh World Cup, Germany qualified 9 sleds.

DOSB announced the competing athletes on 23 January 2017. On 2 February 2017, the Bob- und Schlittenverband für Deutschland had to change some positions. Joshua Bluhm had to leave the team, instead of him Christian Poser changed from the Walther-Four-Man-Bobsled to the Lochner-Four-Man-Bobsled but still stayed with Walther in the Two-Men-Bobsled. Substitute athlete Alexander Rödiger was given the place in the Walther Bobslead. The place of Rödiger as substitute athlete was given to Kevin Korona, Paul Krenz is a second substitute. Substitutes for the women's bobsleds are Ann-Christin Strack and Lisette Thöne.

Men

Women

* – Denotes the driver of each sled

Cross-country skiing

DOSB announced the 5 men and 7 women participating on 23 January 2017.

Distance
Men

Women

Sprint

Figure skating 

Germany qualified one male, one female and two pairs figure skaters, based on its placement at the 2017 World Figure Skating Championships in Helsinki, Finland.  They additionally qualified one quota in ice dancing through the 2017 CS Nebelhorn Trophy. The team was announced during December 2017.

Team trophy

Freestyle skiing

DOSB announced the 3 men and 5 women participating on 23 January 2017.

Halfpipe

Moguls

Ski cross

Qualification legend: FA – Qualify to medal round; FB – Qualify to consolation round

Slopestyle

Ice hockey

Men's tournament

Germany men's national ice hockey team qualified by winning the final qualification tournament in Riga, Latvia.

Summary

Team roster

Preliminary round

Qualification playoff

Quarterfinal

Semifinal

Final

Luge

Based on results of the 2017–18 Luge World Cup, Germany qualified ten athletes and a relay team. The team consists of three athletes each in the individual events and two doubles sleds. The team was officially named on 16 January 2018.

Men

Women

Mixed team relay

Nordic combined

DOSB announced the 5 athletes participating on 23 January 2017.

Short track speed skating

According to the ISU Special Olympic Qualification Rankings, Germany has qualified one man and two women.

On 23 January 2017, DOSB announced that they will only use the 2 female quota and nominated the 2 athletes.

Skeleton 

Based on the world rankings, Germany qualified 6 sleds.

On 23 January 2017, DOSB announced the 6 competing athletes.

Ski jumping

DOSB announced the 5 men and 4 women participating on 23 January 2017.

Men

Women

Snowboarding

DOSB announced the 7 men and 6 women participating on 23 January 2017.

Freestyle

Qualification Legend: QF – Qualify directly to final; QS – Qualify to semifinal

Parallel

Snowboard cross

Speed skating

DOSB announced the 4 men and 5 women participating on 23 January 2017.

Men

Women

Mass start

Team pursuit

References

Nations at the 2018 Winter Olympics
2018
Winter Olympics